Milo is a village in Vulcan County, Alberta, Canada. Milo is mainly an agricultural service community.

Demographics 

In the 2016 Census of Population conducted by Statistics Canada, the Village of Milo recorded a population of 91 living in 49 of its 64 total private dwellings, a  change from its 2011 population of 122.

Amenities 

Amenities include a community hall, curling rink, walking paths, hotel, library, skating area, and school. The village has a grocery, pub, and cafe. The community is home to a Lutheran church and has an active Lions Club which maintains an attractive playground and picnic area. Other services are available in nearby Vulcan (50 km). A campground with 85 sites is located in a small park beside nearby McGregor Lake reservoir. The lake, which is a major part of an irrigation system, is popular for fishing, swimming, windsurfing, boating and birdwatching.

History 
In 1909, Milo was settled 3 kilometres northeast of its present location when Jens (Jim) and Alete Aasgard moved here from Osseo, WI and built their store and home. The town was named for Milo Munro, first postmaster - his post office was in the Aasgards' store. Nearby, a blacksmith shop and Bank of Hamilton opened. Before 1920, the Village of Milo had a telephone office, butcher, pool hall, community hall, and ice cream parlor.

A new railroad extension into the area did not reach the young community, so in 1924, Milo was moved to the side of the train tracks. Most of the buildings were pulled to the new location. The town hall was too large and was dismantled in sections and rebuilt at its new location. Village status was achieved in 1931.

A World War II Royal Canadian Air Force navigator, Harlo "Terry" Taerum, the son of a Norwegian immigrant, spent his early years on a farm a few kilometers from Milo and attended school in the community. In May 1943, in Operation Chastise, commonly known as the "Dambuster Raid," he navigated the lead Lancaster bomber at very low level, at night, to the primary target, a power dam inside Germany.  He was killed on a later raid in September 1943.

A new community hall was built in 1985 and the curling rink expanded and renovated in 1998. Since 2000, developments along the shores of McGregor Lake have attracted cottagers and vacationers from Calgary.  The original site of the village - the Aasgards' farmstead and store - are now part of Canada's largest comb honey beekeeping farm, owned by Don and Ron Miksha.

See also 
List of communities in Alberta
List of villages in Alberta

References

External links 

1931 establishments in Alberta
Populated places established in 1909
Villages in Alberta
Vulcan County